The Jersey City Fire Department is the largest fire department in the state of New Jersey and provides fire protection, hazardous materials services, and first responder emergency medical services to the city of Jersey City.

The department is part of the Metro USAR Strike Team, which consists of nine North Jersey fire departments and other emergency services divisions working to address major emergency rescue situations.

History
The department got its start in the spring of 1829 after several fires occurred in the city and the public demanded fire protection. Thirty citizens signed up and on September 21, 1829, the Liberty Engine Company No. 1 was established.

Jersey City's fire department was the only New Jersey department to receive an official call for assistance during the September 11 attacks, with hundreds of department personnel assisting in the Ground Zero cleanup effort. Among the first responders who perished on that day was Fire Department of Jersey City dispatcher Joseph Lovero, who was hit by a piece of debris. The Fire Department of Jersey City named its fireboat after him.

Stations and apparatus

Disbanded fire companies
Throughout the JCFD's history, several fire companies have been disbanded due to budget cuts to the department and reorganization. Reserve and spare apparatus assigned with disbanded company numbers
 Engine 1 – 153 Morgan St. (Re-Established Jan.2021)
 Engine 3 – 38 Mercer St.
 Engine 4 – 355 Newark Ave. (Re-designated as Squad 4 at 582 Communipaw Ave.)
 Engine 12 – 103 Webster Ave.
 Engine 16 – 93 Belmont Ave. 
 Engine 20 – 582 Communipaw Ave.
 Engine 21 – 9th St. & Grove St.
 Ladder 1 – 160 Grand St.
 Ladder 5 – 582 Communipaw Ave.
 Ladder 10 – 520 Palisade Ave.
 Water Tower 1 – 520 Palisade Ave.
Hose 1 – 153 Morgan St.
Salvage 1 - 666 Summit Ave. 
Hose Reel - 355 Newark Ave.

References

External links

 Official Website
 FDJC Fire History

Fire departments in New Jersey
 
1829 establishments in New Jersey